Gudipala is one of the mandals in Chittoor district of Andhra Pradesh. Gudipala is a Suburb of Chittoor City. It is located near the Andhra-Tamil Nadu state border. Gudipala mandal headquarters is 20 km far from Vellore City And 12 km far from Chittoor City. In 2012 some gram panchayats of Gudipala Mandal were added to Chittoor Municipal Corporation (CHUDA).

Both public and private transport are available. Many educational institutions were there around the mandal. Private Town buses run from Chittoor to Pillarikuppam via Gudipala. Gudipala is a suburb of Chittoorcity.

References 

Villages in Chittoor district
Mandal headquarters in Chittoor district